Snooker world rankings 2011/2012: The professional world rankings for all the professional snooker players who qualified for the 2011–12 season are listed below. The rankings work as a two-year rolling list. The points for each tournament two years ago are removed, when the corresponding tournament during the current season has finished. The following table contains the rankings, which were used to determine the seedings for certain tournaments.

Notes

 Revision 1 was used for the seeding of the Australian Goldfields Open and Shanghai Masters.
 Revision 2 was used for the seeding of the UK Championship, German Masters, Masters and Snooker Shoot-Out.
 Revision 3 was used for the seeding of the Welsh Open, World Open and China Open.
 Revision 4 was used for the seeding of the World Championship.

References

2011
Rankings 2012
Rankings 2011